Wood Grove is a historic plantation house located near Bear Poplar, Rowan County, North Carolina.  It was built about 1825, and is a -story, three bay, Federal style brick dwelling.  It sits on a stone foundation, has a hipped roof front porch, and one-story rear kitchen ell.

It was listed on the National Register of Historic Places in 1982.

History
The original owners were Thomas Cowan (1748-1817) and Abel Cowan (1789-1843).

References

Plantation houses in North Carolina
Houses on the National Register of Historic Places in North Carolina
Federal architecture in North Carolina
Houses completed in 1825
Houses in Rowan County, North Carolina
National Register of Historic Places in Rowan County, North Carolina